Ogliastro Cilento is a town and comune in the province of Salerno in the Campania region of south-western Italy. As of 2011 its population was of 2,241.

History
First mentioned in 1059 as Oleastrum (Latin word referred to the Olive tree), the town was part of Agropoli, a fief of the bishop of Paestum, until 1556.

Geography

Overview
Located in northern Cilento, few km from the Cilentan Coast and the Ancient Greek town of Paestum (11 km), Ogliastro Cilento is a hill town bordering with the municipalities of Agropoli, Cicerale, and Prignano Cilento. Crossed by the national road SS18 Naples-Reggio Calabria, it is 8 km far from Agropoli, 30 from Vallo della Lucania, 32 from Battipaglia, and 56 from Salerno.

Frazioni
The hamlets (frazioni) of Ogliastro the villages of Eredita and Finocchito. The municipality counts also the localities (composed of few scattered farmhouses) of Ginestre, Purgatorio, Santa Caterina, and Santa Maria della Grazia.

Eredita is the most populated hamlet, and is located close to Ogliastro, below a hill. It was first mentioned in 1103 as Heredita.
Finocchito is a small village located in the eastern side of the municipality, near the mountain road to Cicerale. Its population is of 82.

Demographics

See also
Cilentan dialect
Cilento and Vallo di Diano National Park

References

External links

 Ogliastro Cilento official website

Cities and towns in Campania
Localities of Cilento